Khvostovo is a rural locality (a village) in Yuchkinskoye Rural Settlement, Vozhegodsky District, Vologda Oblast, Russia. The population was 41 as of 2002.

Geography 
The distance to Vozhega is 30 km, to Yuchka is 6 km. Ivanovskaya, Manuilovskaya, Yuchka are the nearest rural localities.

References 

Rural localities in Vozhegodsky District